Signe Marie Stray Ryssdal (née Signe Marie Stray; 22 July 1924–18 May 2019) was a Norwegian lawyer and politician for the Liberal Party.

Early life and education 
Stray Ryssdal was born in Tromøy as a daughter of barristers Sigrid Stray (née Kluge; 1893–1978) and Christian Stray (1894–1981). She finished her secondary education in 1943, and studied law at the University of Oslo from 1945 to 1948. She spent the summer of 1948 studying at the Peace Palace.

Career 
Stray Ryssdal was a deputy judge in Kragerø and Steigen before working as a secretary and inspector in Riksskattestyret from 1951 to 1956.

In 1956, she opened her own law practice in Oslo. She became a barrister with access to Supreme Court cases in 1960, as the third woman in Norway. In politics, she served as a deputy representative to the Parliament of Norway from Oslo from 1965 to 1973, and was a member of Oslo city council from 1968 to 1972. In 1972 she left the lawyer job to become chief administrative officer of social affairs in Oslo. She stood for parliamentary election in 1973 on the Liberal People's Party ballot, but was not elected. Her career ended with the post of County Governor of Aust-Agder, which she held from 1983 until her retirement in 1994.

Stray Ryssdal was the chairman of the board of the National Insurance Administration from 1968 to 1980. She was a member of several public boards and committees; some of them as a jurist and some of them as a non-jurist, chairing  from 1979 to 1993. She led the committees that published the Norwegian Official Reports 1976:1 and 1988:39. She was also active in several organizations, including the Norwegian Bar Association.

Personal life 
In December 1954, she married Rolv Ryssdal (1914–1998), who would become Chief Justice of the Supreme Court. Stray Ryssdal resided in Arendal. Stray Ryssdal died in the Norwegian town of Arendal on 18 May 2019, at the age of 94.

References

1924 births
2019 deaths
People from Arendal
University of Oslo alumni
Norwegian women lawyers
Liberal Party (Norway) politicians
Liberal People's Party (Norway, 1972) politicians
20th-century Norwegian women politicians
20th-century Norwegian politicians
Politicians from Oslo
Deputy members of the Storting
County governors of Norway
Women members of the Storting
21st-century Norwegian lawyers
20th-century Norwegian lawyers
Stray family
20th-century women lawyers
21st-century women lawyers